Pyrrhulina is a genus of freshwater fishes found in tropical South America. Several of these species are popular aquarium fish.

Pyrrhulina is closely related to Copeina and Copella, although it is distinguished from the former by having only one row of teeth (Copeina spp. have two). When the genus Copella was established, many species were removed from the genus Pyrrhulina and placed there, because differences in the maxillary bones in the males had been detected. Copella species are slimmer and more elongated than those species that remained in the genus Pyrrhulina.

Species
The 18 currently recognized species in this genus are:
 Pyrrhulina australis C. H. Eigenmann & C. H. Kennedy, 1903
 Pyrrhulina beni N. E. Pearson, 1924
 Pyrrhulina brevis Steindachner, 1876
 Pyrrhulina eleanorae Fowler, 1940
 Pyrrhulina elongata Zarske & Géry, 2001
 Pyrrhulina filamentosa Valenciennes, 1847
 Pyrrhulina laeta (Cope, 1872) (halfbanded pyrrhulina)
 Pyrrhulina lugubris C. H. Eigenmann, 1922
 Pyrrhulina marilynae Netto-Ferreira & Marinho, 2013
 Pyrrhulina maxima C. H. Eigenmann & R. S. Eigenmann, 1889
 Pyrrhulina melanostoma (Cope, 1870) (blackmouth pyrrhulina)
 Pyrrhulina obermulleri G. S. Myers, 1926
 Pyrrhulina rachoviana G. S. Myers, 1926 (fanning pyrrhulina)
 Pyrrhulina semifasciata Steindachner, 1876
 Pyrrhulina spilota S. H. Weitzman, 1960
 Pyrrhulina stoli Boeseman, 1953
 Pyrrhulina vittata Regan, 1912 (banded pyrrhulina)
 Pyrrhulina zigzag Zarske & Géry, 1997

Classification / Names

Actinopteri (ray-finned fishes) > Characiformes (Characins) > Lebiasinidae (Pencilfishes) > Pyrrhulininae
Etymology: Pyrrhulina: Greek, pyrrhos = red, with the colour of the fire (Ref. 45335).
More on authors: Eigenmann & Kennedy.

Environment
Freshwater; benthopelagic. Tropical

Length at first maturity / Size / Weight / Age
Maturity: Lm 2.2 
Max length : 5.0 cm SL male/unsexed.

References

Lebiasinidae
Fish of South America
Taxa named by Achille Valenciennes
Tropical fish